Parallel Lives is a Big Finish original novella collection, featuring Bernice Summerfield, a character from the spin-off media based on the long-running British science fiction television series Doctor Who.

Stories

External links
Big Finish Productions - Parallel Lives

Bernice Summerfield novels
2006 British novels